The Mellon Mario Lemieux Celebrity Invitational was an event on the Celebrity Players Tour held from 1998 to 2005 at The Club at Nevillewood in Presto, Pennsylvania.  The tournament benefited the Mario Lemieux Foundation for cancer research.

History
The first two tournaments were sponsored by Toyota.  Mellon Financial picked up the title sponsorship starting in 2000. Tournament host Mario Lemieux finished in the top ten of this tournament in 2000, finishing in a tie for tenth.

Winners
1998 Rick Rhoden
1999 Rick Rhoden
2000 Dan Quinn
2001 Rick Rhoden
2002 Jack Wagner
2003 Rick Rhoden
2004 Pierre Larouche
2005 Pierre Larouche

External links
 Mario Lemieux Foundation official website

Golf in Pittsburgh